Francisco Muñoz may refer to:

 Xisco (footballer born 1980), Spanish footballer
 Francisco Munoz (goalball player) (born 1972), Spanish goalball player
 Francisco Pedraja Muñoz (born 1927), Spanish painter